The Bishan Temple or Guangji Maopeng ( or ) is a Buddhist temple located in Taihuai Town of Wutai County, Xinzhou, Shanxi, China.

History
In the Qingliangshan Annals, a poem described Bishan Temple as "".

Baiyun Temple was first established in the reign of Emperor Xiaowen of Northern Wei (467-499) and initially called "Beishan Temple".

In the period of Emperor Yingzong of Ming (1435-1449 and 1457-1464) in the Ming dynasty (1368-1644), it was renamed "Puji Temple".

In the reign of the Qianlong Emperor (1711-1799), because the temple is surrounded by mountains, it is also called Bishan Temple. Later in the reign of Emperor Xuantong (1908-1912), it was also named "Guangji Maopeng".

In 1983 it has been designated as a "National Key Buddhist Temples in Han Chinese Area".

On August 26, 2017, master Dayun, a student of Chan master Miaojiang served as abbot of Biyun Temple.

Architecture

Paifang
Under the paifang is a horizontal inscribed board with the Chinese characters "". A wooden plaque with a couplet is hung on the two side pillars. It says "".

Hall of Four Heavenly Kings
Maitreya is enshrined in the Hall of Four Heavenly Kings and at the back of his statue is a statue of Skanda. Statues of Four Heavenly Kings stand on the left and right sides.

Pilu Hall
The Pilu Hall, also known as "Leiyin Baodian", in the middle is Pilu Buddha, the  twelve Bodhisattva stand on the platform of gable wall. On the left, from back to front, they are statues of Miaode, Puyan, Maitreya, Weide Zizai, Jingzhu Yezhang and Yuanjue. On the right, from back to front, they are statues of Samantabhadra, Jingangzang, Qingjinghui, Bianyin, Pujue and Xianshan. A pair of Buddha's warrior stand on both sides of the gate.

Zhaobi
The Zhaobi is built by stones and bricks. A Chinese poem is carved in the Zhaobi. It reads: ""

Jietan Hall (Hall of Ordination Altar)
Jietan Hall (Hall of Ordination Altar), the most important hall in the temple, is the third hall of the temple. The present ordination altar  was built in the Ming dynasty (1368-1644). A sitting statue of Sakyamni which was brought from Burma in 1928 stands on the ordination altar. Both sides of the statue enshrine the Eighteen Arhats, they were made in the Shunzhi period (1644-1661) of Qing dynasty (1644-1912).

Buddhist Texts Library
The Buddhist Texts Library is a two-story wooden structure. The sitting statue of Maitreya is placed with his head to the two-story.

References

External links

Buddhist temples on Mount Wutai
Wutai County
Xinzhou